Luigi Sabatelli (21 February 1772 – 29 January 1850) was an Italian painter of the Neoclassic period, active in Milan, Rome, and his native city of Florence.

Biography
He studied in his native city and in Rome. In 1803, with the reorganization of the Brera Academy of Fine Arts of Milan, Sabatelli was named professor of painting, replacing il Traballesi, and held the post until his death, except for a brief furlough between 1822 and 1825. His first important work in oils was the large picture representing the Meeting of David and Abigail, which now hangs opposite Benvenuti's Judith in the Lady Chapel of the cathedral at Arezzo.  Sabatelli's reputation rests on frescos (1822–1825) in the Hall of the Iliad at the Pitti Palace (the first room of the Picture Gallery), consisting of eight lunettes and a large circular medallion illustrating scenes from the Homeric poems.

His sons, Giuseppe (1813–1843) and Francesco Sabatelli (1801–1829), were painters and professors of art in Florence; both died young. Among his pupils were Carlo Arienti, Giuseppe Sogni, Luigi Pedrazzi, Giuseppe Penuti, Michelangelo Fumagalli, Giacomo Marinez, Girolamo Daverio Luzzi, and Giulio Arrivabene. Alessandro Durini was also a pupil.

References

1772 births
1850 deaths
18th-century Italian painters
Italian male painters
19th-century Italian painters
Academic staff of Brera Academy
19th-century Italian people
Italian neoclassical painters
Painters from Florence
19th-century Italian male artists
18th-century Italian male artists